Essad Pasha Toptani or Esad Pasha Toptani (1863/4 or 1875 – 13 June 1920), mainly known as Essad Pasha, was an Ottoman army officer who served as the Albanian deputy in the Ottoman Parliament. He was a prominent politician in early 20th-century Albania. Toptani cooperated with the Balkan League after the Balkan Wars and established a state in central Albania, based in Durrës, called the Republic of Central Albania.

Biography

Early life

Essad Pasha was born in 1863 in Tirana, Ottoman Empire (modern Republic of Albania), the son of Ali Bey Toptani and Vasfije Alizoti. He was a member of the Toptani family, a prominent landowning noble family who founded the current city of Tirana. During Ottoman rule, Toptani served as a kaymakam and had command of the gendarmerie in Tirana. In 1908, having served as gendarmerie commander in Janina, he joined the Young Turks (CUP) and became a member of the Ottoman parliament as the deputy for Durrës. In the aftermath of the 31 March Incident, on 27 April 1909 four CUP members went to inform sultan Abdul Hamid II of his dethronement, with Toptani being the main messenger saying "the nation has deposed you". As a result, the focus of the sultan's rage was toward Toptani whom Abdul Hamid II felt had betrayed him. The sultan referred to him as a "wicked man", given that the extended Toptani family had benefited from royal patronage in gaining privileges and key positions in the Ottoman government.

First Balkan War
In 1912 during the Albanian revolt and aftermath of the Ottoman parliamentary elections, parliamentarians Toptani and Syrja Vlora represented the Albanian side in a parliamentary discussion with the Young Turks. Both called for the cessation of government force and implementation of good governance to alleviate the situation in Albanian lands. Amidst the Albanian Revolt of 1912 Essad Pasha Toptani obliged himself to organize the uprising in Central Albania and Mirdita. On 30 January 1913, Hasan Riza Pasha, commander of Shkodër, was ambushed and killed by unknown people disguised as women, thought to be Osman Bali and Mehmet Kavaja, two Albanian officers of Essad Pasha. Riza Pasha wanted to keep up the defense of the besieged city, and after his death Essad Pasha continued his resistance until April 1913. He turned the fortress of Shkodër over to Montenegro, only in April 1913 after a prolonged war and great heroism of Albanian and Turkish soldiers. Essad Pasha was allowed in return to leave the town with his army and all their weaponry to become involved in the struggle over power in central Albania.

In July 1913 he was persuaded by the Vlora family to accept a position of minister of the interior in the provisional government, but on 16 October 1913, to frustrate Ismail Qemali, Toptani who depicted Qemali as a Greek agent, set up a rival government of his own in Durrës, called the Republic of Central Albania. Officially Serbia simultaneously helped a number of other small tribal chiefs who resisted Ismail Qemali's government, directing them towards cooperation with Essad Pasha.

Peasant Revolt
He reluctantly stepped down when forced to do so by the Great Powers on 1 February 1914, being given as a consolation prize the right to lead the Albanian delegation that travelled to Neuwied on the Rhine, in Germany, to offer the Albanian throne to Prince Wilhem zu Wied. Back in Albania, relations between the Prince and the scheming Toptani, now minister of war and minister of the interior soon soured. Essad Pasha led a faction of his own in the Peasant Revolt in Albania against Prince Wilhem. He was the only person in Albania to have a self-contained army of his own, and strove to grab as much of the country as he could. On 9 January, his men tried to take Elbasan, but they were repulsed by the governor of the town, Aqif Pasha Elbasani.

On 19 May 1914, when Toptani refused to lay down his weapons, armed forces under Dutch gendarmerie officer Johan Sluys surrounded and shelled his house in Durrës, forcing him to surrender. He was arrested for conspiracy, though after consultations with Prince zu Wied, he was not court-martialled but sent to Bari in southern Italy and banned from returning to Albania.

Exile and the Treaty of Niš

From exile in Rome, he maintained close links with the Serbian and Montenegrin governments. After the outbreak of the First World War, Toptani travelled to Niš, Kingdom of Serbia, where he and Serbian prime minister Nikola Pašić signed the secret Treaty of Serbian-Albanian Alliance on 17 September 1914. With Italian and Serbian financial backing he established armed forces, Toptani invaded Dibër on 20 September, and by 3 October 1914 he had taken Durrës without a fight. Serbian Prime Minister Nikola Pašić ordered that his followers be aided with money and arms.

His power base in central Albania was weakened in November 1914 by an uprising of Muslim rebels who turned against him, but he managed, with Italian support, to hold on to the town of Durrës. Toptani's rule was not stable because of the First World War. In the end of 1914, Essad secretly agreed with the Greek government to support the annexation of the southern provinces, known to Greeks as Northern Epirus, to the Kingdom of Greece. He soon declared war on Austria-Hungary to show support for the Entente, and profited from the situation enormously by taxing all the Allied supplies sent to the Serbs. During the Serbian armies retreat through Albania in 1915, troops under Toptani's command gave support and protection to the Serbian column where possible. When Austro-Hungarian forces swept through much of central and northern Albania in the spring of 1916, Toptani fled to Salonika from there went to France, to represent Albania at the Paris Peace Conference.

For the next two years, Essad Pasha remained in Paris, attempting to organize recognition for Albania from the Great Powers and reject the secret pact of London, which planned the division of Albania. During this time Tirana and much of central Albania was controlled by his Field Commander, Osman Bali and his most trusted adviser Ramazan Biba, member of a prominent Tirana family.

Death

On 13 June 1920, Avni Rustemi assassinated Essad Pasha in Paris when he left the Hotel Continental. Essad Pasha was buried in the Serbian Military Cemetery in Paris, after staying for a long time unburied in the mortuary.

Legacy

Awards in his lifetime 
For his service in the Greco-Turkish War (1897) the High Porte awarded him with the Order of Osmanieh of 2nd Class and afterwards he was ranked Miralay. Furthermore, for his contribution in the Macedonian front as an ally of the Entente, he was awarded with the title Officier of the Legion of Honour and with the Croix de Guerre. He was awarded Order of the White Eagle.

Historical 
Essad Pasha had a reputation as an unscrupulous opportunist, Edith Durham viewed Essad Pasha as "a strange relic of the middle ages ... one with the handsome swashbucklers who sold themselves and their services to the rival monarchs, princelings and dukes in the fifteenth and sixteenth centuries, and cheerfully transferred themselves to the enemy if he offered better pay – men in whom the sense of nationality was not developed at all, and whose sense of honour was, to put it mildly, deficient."

Perception 
Toptani is remembered among Albanians as one of the most negative historical figures and the symbol of treason.

In 2014, the Serbian Minister of Labor, Aleksandar Vulin paid homage at his grave, for his contributions to Serbia.

Films
Two shots in Paris (:sq:Dy krisma në Paris) is a drama by Sheri Mita, Pëllumb Kulla with the subject of Essad Pasha Toptani murder in Paris and trial of Avni Rustemi

Notes

References

External links
 Essad Pasha Toptani, Memorandum on Albania, 1919
 
  Maison royale d'Albanie, site officiel
  Famille royale d'Albanie, site officiel

Bibliography

 
 
 Patrice Najbor, Histoire de l'Albanie et de sa Maison Royale (5 volumes), JePublie, Paris, 2008,.
 Patrice Najbor, la dynastye des Zogu, Textes & Prétextes, Paris, 2002
 Biodata on Essad Pasha by O.S. Pearson, who authored Albania and King Zog, 2005.

1863 births
1920 deaths
Albanian people murdered abroad
Albanian military personnel
Albanian Muslims
19th-century Albanian people
Assassinated Albanian politicians
Honorary Knights Commander of the Order of St Michael and St George
People murdered in France
Government ministers of Albania
Prime Ministers of Albania
Ottoman military personnel of the Balkan Wars
Essad
Politicians from Tirana
Officiers of the Légion d'honneur
Recipients of the Croix de Guerre (France)
Albanian Pashas